The Comoros Cup is the top knockout tournament of the Comoros football. It was created in 1982.

Winners

See also
 Comoros Premier League
 Comoros Super Cup

External links
 List of Comoros Cup Winners - rsssf.com

Football competitions in the Comoros
National association football cups